In chemistry, a group (also known as a family) is a column of elements in the periodic table of the chemical elements. There are 18 numbered groups in the periodic table; the 14 f-block columns, between groups 2 and 3, are not numbered. The elements in a group have similar physical or chemical characteristics of the outermost electron shells of their atoms (i.e., the same core charge), because most chemical properties are dominated by the orbital location of the outermost electron.  

There are three systems of group numbering for the groups; the same number may be assigned to different groups depending on the system being used. The modern numbering system of "group 1" to "group 18" has been recommended by the International Union of Pure and Applied Chemistry (IUPAC) since 1988. It replaces two older incompatible naming schemes, used by the Chemical Abstract Service (CAS, more popular in the United States), and by IUPAC before 1988 (more popular in Europe). The system of eighteen groups is generally accepted by the chemistry community, but some dissent exists about membership of elements number 1 and 2 (hydrogen and helium). Similar variation on the inner transition metals continues to exist in textbooks, although the correct positioning has been known since 1948 and was twice endorsed by IUPAC in 1988 (together with the 1–18 numbering) and 2021.

Groups may also be identified using their topmost element, or have a specific name. For example, group 16 is also described as the "oxygen group" and as the "chalcogens". An exception is the "iron group", which usually refers to "group 8", but in chemistry may also mean iron, cobalt, and nickel, or some other set of elements with similar chemical properties. In astrophysics and nuclear physics, it usually refers to iron, cobalt, nickel, chromium, and manganese.

Group names
Modern group names are numbers 1–18, with the 14 f-block columns remaining unnumbered (together making the 32 columns in the periodic table). Also, trivial names (like halogens) are common. In history, several sets of group names have been used, based on Roman numberings I–VIII, and "A" and "B" suffixes.

List of group names

 Coinage metals: authors differ on whether roentgenium (Rg) is considered a coinage metal. It is in group 11, like the other coinage metals, and is expected to be chemically similar to gold. On the other hand, being extremely radioactive and short-lived, it cannot actually be used for coinage as the name suggests, and on that basis it is sometimes excluded.

 triels (group 13), from Greek tri: three, III
 tetrels (group 14), from Greek tetra: four, IV
 pentel (group 15), from Greek penta: five, V

CAS and old IUPAC numbering (A/B)
Two earlier group number systems exist: CAS (Chemical Abstracts Service) and old IUPAC. Both use numerals (Arabic or Roman) and letters A and B. Both systems agree on the numbers. The numbers indicate approximately the highest oxidation number of the elements in that group, and so indicate similar chemistry with other elements with the same numeral. The number proceeds in a linearly increasing fashion for the most part, once on the left of the table, and once on the right (see List of oxidation states of the elements), with some irregularities in the transition metals. However, the two systems use the letters differently. For example, potassium (K) has one valence electron. Therefore, it is located in group 1. Calcium (Ca) is in group 2, for it contains two valence electrons.

In the old IUPAC system the letters A and B were designated to the left (A) and right (B) part of the table, while in the CAS system the letters A and B are designated to main group elements (A) and transition elements (B). The old IUPAC system was frequently used in Europe, while the CAS is most common in America. The new IUPAC scheme was developed to replace both systems as they confusingly used the same names to mean different things. The new system simply numbers the groups increasingly from left to right on the standard periodic table. The IUPAC proposal was first circulated in 1985 for public comments, and was later included as part of the 1990 edition of the Nomenclature of Inorganic Chemistry.

Non-columnwise groups
While groups are defined to be columns in the periodic table, as described above, there are also sets of elements named "group" that are not a column: 

Similar sets: noble metals, coinage metals, precious metals, refractory metals.

References

Further reading

Periodic table